The tropical spiny agama, northern ground agama, or Peter's ground agama (Agama armata) is a species of lizard from the family Agamidae, found in most of sub-Saharan Africa. The species is found in South Africa, Mozambique, Namibia, Botswana, Zambia, Eswatini, southern Democratic Republic of the Congo (Zaire), southwestern Kenya, and central Tanzania.

Description
A small ground-dwelling agama, it reaches a length of 22 cm and is coloured grey, brown, or red with pale crossbars along the vertebral pale stripe. Displaying males' heads are coloured green or blue.

References

External links
 Agama armata, Calphotos
 Agama armata, GBIF

armata
Agamid lizards of Africa
Reptiles described in 1855
Taxa named by Wilhelm Peters
Reptiles of South Africa